The Venetian Macao Tennis Showdown, in 2007 was the grand finale of a three-leg Pete Sampras vs Roger Federer Asia exhibition match tour.  The previous legs were in Seoul, Korea on November 20, Kuala Lumpur, Malaysia on November 22.

On November 20, Sampras lost the first of the three exhibition matches in Asia against Roger Federer losing 6–4, 6–3 in Seoul, Korea. Two days later in Kuala Lumpur (The Clash of Times), Sampras again lost to Federer, 7–6(6), 7–6(5). However, Sampras was able to win the last match of the series (The Venetian Macao Tennis Showdown), winning 7–6(6), 6–4.

Format Of The Venetian Macao Tennis Showdown 2007: (Saturday November 24, 2007)
 Venue: The Venetian Macao
 Surface: Gerflor Tennis Tournament
 Match: Pete Sampras Vs Roger Federer (Best Of 3 Tie-Break Sets)

2008 
John McEnroe, Björn Borg, Roger Federer and James Blake. Four champions across two eras faced off in this tennis spectacular. It was the second group of challenge matches held in Macao (on November 20), the first being the Showdown of Champions format held in Kuala Lumpur on 18 November.

Format Of The Venetian Macao Tennis Showdown 2008: (Thursday, November 20, 2008, Cotai Strip CotaiArena, Macao)
 Surface: Gerflor Taraflex ATP
 Match 1 (1 Set)
John McEnroe Vs Björn Borg
 Match 2 (Best Of 3 Tie-Break Sets)
Roger Federer Vs James Blake
 Match 3 (10 Point Doubles Tie-Breaker)
Björn Borg/Roger Federer Vs John McEnroe/James Blake

The final results were:
 Björn Borg def. John McEnroe, 7-6
 Roger Federer def. James Blake 6–4, 6-4
 John McEnroe/James Blake def. Björn Borg/Roger Federer 10–7 in a 10 Point Doubles Tie-Breaker

External links
 sportspotter.com

References
 The Venetian Macao Tennis Showdown 2007
 The Venetian Macao Tennis Showdown 2008

Sport in Macau
Exhibition tennis tournaments
2007 in Macau sport
2008 in Macau sport
2007 in tennis
2008 in tennis
Tennis tournaments in Macau